The State Theatre opened in 1932 on the corner of Victoria and London Streets in Hamilton, New Zealand. The movie theater remained in operation under that name until 1964 when, after a 10½-week renovation, it reopened as the Carlton Theatre and operated under that name until the early 1990s. After the Village Five cinemas opened in the Centre Place shopping mall in 1992, the State (along with many Hamilton theatres) closed. The building was used by the Fountain City Christian Church for several years thereafter.

The building was sold in 2001 to Bayleys Real Estate; while the building still stands, little remains of its original appearance.

References

External links
Missing Hamilton Architecture

Buildings and structures in Hamilton, New Zealand
Cinemas in New Zealand
1930s architecture in New Zealand